Ghanefo Ansumana Agogo Kromah (born 24 December 1993) is a Liberian professional footballer who plays as a forward for Tollygunge Agragami in the Calcutta Football League.

Career
Kromah made his professional debut in India, playing for Peerless SC in Calcutta Football League. He then made his top-tier league appearance for Churchill Brothers in the I-League against Minerva Punjab. He came on as a substitute in 72nd minute. He rejoined Quess East Bengal on 22 January 2020.

Later, he joined Bhawanipore FC and represented the club at the 2019–20 I-League 2nd Division.

On 5 January 2022, he moved to Nepali Martyr's Memorial A-Division League side Three Star Club.

Personal life
Kromah hails from a very poor family consisting of seven brothers and one sister. Earning money by playing football has helped him to take care of his family.

Kromah's wife is a Bengali girl named Puja Dutta whom he had met through Facebook. He considers her as his lucky charm as he got an offer to play for Mohun Bagan 10 days after meeting her.

Career statistics

References

External links

1992 births
Living people
Liberian footballers
Liberian expatriate sportspeople in India
Churchill Brothers FC Goa players
Association football midfielders
I-League players
Sportspeople from Monrovia
Liberian expatriate footballers
Expatriate footballers in India
Barrack Young Controllers FC players
Peerless SC players
Calcutta Football League players